Lenny Vallier (born 24 April 1999) is a French professional footballer who plays as a defender for Chamois Niortais F.C.

Professional career
Vallier helped Stade de Reims win the 2017–18 Ligue 2, helping promote them to the Ligue 1 for the 2018-19 season.

Career statistics

Honours
Reims
 Ligue 2 (1): 2017–18

References

External links
 
 

1999 births
Living people
Association football defenders
French footballers
Ligue 2 players
Championnat National players
Stade de Reims players
Pau FC players
Chamois Niortais F.C. players
AS Choisy-le-Roi players
Footballers from Seine-Saint-Denis